Fu Qiutao (August 3, 1907 – August 25, 1981) was a People's Liberation Army senior general and a People's Republic of China politician. He was born in Pingjiang County, Hunan Province. He was vice-governor and the 2nd Communist Party of China Committee Secretary of Shandong Province. He was a delegate to the 3rd, 4th and 5th National People's Congress.

1907 births
1981 deaths
People's Liberation Army generals from Hunan
People's Republic of China politicians from Hunan
Chinese Communist Party politicians from Hunan
Political office-holders in Shandong
Delegates to the 3rd National People's Congress
Delegates to the 4th National People's Congress
Delegates to the 5th National People's Congress
Vice-governors of Shandong
Politicians from Yueyang